Li Hong is a soteriological figure in religious Daoist prophecies wherein he appears at the end of the world cycle to rescue the chosen people, who would be distinguished by certain talismans, practices, and virtues.

Daoist texts 
Myths surrounding Li Hong took shape in literature during the Han dynasty. He is depicted in the Daoist Divine Incantations Scripture as someone who would reappear to set right heaven and earth at a time of upheaval and chaos.

Rebellions 
Prophesies concerning Li Hong's appearance have been used to legitimize numerous rebellions and insurgencies, all of which rallied around a Li Hong. These were particularly prevalent during the fifth century, and continued to appear until the Song dynasty.

See also

References

Works cited 

 
 
 
 

Taoist mythology
Prophecy
Apocalypticism
Messianism